trans-o-Hydroxybenzylidenepyruvate hydratase-aldolase (2′-hydroxybenzalpyruvate aldolase, NsaE, tHBPA hydratase-aldolase) is an enzyme with systematic name (3E)-4-(2-hydroxyphenyl)-2-oxobut-3-enoate hydro-lyase. This enzyme catalyses the following chemical reaction

 (3E)-4-(2-hydroxyphenyl)-2-oxobut-3-enoate + H2O  salicylaldehyde + pyruvate

This enzyme is involved in naphthalene degradation.

References

External links 
 

EC 4.1.2